The 2008 Boston Red Sox season was the 108th season in the franchise's Major League Baseball history. The Red Sox finished in second place in the American League East with a record of 95 wins and 67 losses, two games behind the Tampa Bay Rays. The Red Sox qualified for the postseason as the AL wild card, and defeated the American League West champion Los Angeles Angels of Anaheim in the ALDS. The Red Sox then lost to the Rays in the ALCS in seven games.

In late March, the team started the regular season playing in Tokyo against the Oakland Athletics for MLB Japan Opening Day 2008. In July, seven Red Sox players were selected for the AL All-Star team, with outfielder J. D. Drew being named the game's MVP. On July 31st, the Red Sox traded long-time star player Manny Ramirez to the Dodgers in a three-way blockbuster (which also included the Pirates) for Jason Bay and minor leaguer Josh Wilson. In September, the team officially retired uniform number 6 in honor of Johnny Pesky.

Regular season

Opening Day lineup

Season standings

Notable transactions
 May 22, 2008: Julián Tavárez was released by the Red Sox.
 July 12, 2008: Bobby Kielty was released by the Red Sox.
 July 31, 2008: As part of a three-team trade, star outfielder Jason Bay was acquired by the Red Sox from the Pirates for pitcher Craig Hansen and outfielder/first baseman Brandon Moss. Also in exchange, the Red Sox sent star outfielder Manny Ramirez to the Dodgers.
 August 12, 2008: Paul Byrd was acquired by the Red Sox from the Indians in exchange for a player to be named later.
 August 22, 2008: David Ross signed as a free agent with the Red Sox.
 August 27, 2008: Mark Kotsay was acquired by the Red Sox from the Braves in exchange for minor leaguer Luis Sumoza.

Roster

Record vs. opponents

Game log

Player stats

Batters
Note: G = Games played; AB = At bats; R = Runs scored; H = Hits; 2B = Doubles; 3B = Triples; HR = Home runs; RBI = Runs batted in; AVG = Batting average; SB = Stolen bases; Bold Indicates team leader in category.

Pitchers
Note: W = Wins; L = Losses; ERA = Earned run average; G = Games pitched; GS = Games started; SV = Saves; IP = Innings pitched; R = Runs allowed; ER = Earned runs allowed; BB = Walks allowed; K = Strikeouts

* indicates player led their respectable league in that certain category
** indicates player led all of baseball in that certain category

Led team in starters ERA
Led in team ERA
Allowed fewest runs as a starter for the Red Sox
Led team in runs allowed.
Led team in walks allowed.
Led starters in walks allowed.

Awards and honors

 J. D. Drew – AL Player of the Month (June)
 Jon Lester – Hutch Award, AL Pitcher of the Month (July, September), AL Player of the Week (May 19–25)
 Dustin Pedroia – American League MVP, Silver Slugger Award (2B), Gold Glove Award (2B)
 Manny Ramirez – AL Player of the Week (April 14–April 20)
 Kevin Youkilis – Hank Aaron Award, AL Player of the Week (May 5–April 11)

All-Star Game

Farm system

Source:

References

External links

2008 Boston Red Sox season at Baseball Almanac
2008 Boston Red Sox at Baseball Reference
2008 Boston Red Sox Draft Selections

Boston Red Sox seasons
Boston Red Sox
Boston Red Sox
Red Sox